FTII may refer to:
 Film and Television Institute of India, Pune
 Fellow of the Chartered Institute of Taxation in the United Kingdom